Hogan is an unincorporated community in Iron County, in the U.S. state of Missouri.

History
A post office called Hogan was established in 1880, and remained in operation until 1943. The community has the name of Joe Hogan, the proprietor of a nearby iron mine.

References

Unincorporated communities in Iron County, Missouri
Unincorporated communities in Missouri